Gordon Edmund McKenzie (June 26, 1927 – July 19, 2013) was an American athlete who competed in the 10,000 meters at the 1956 Summer Olympics in Melbourne, Australia and the marathon at the 1960 Summer Olympics in Rome, Italy. McKenzie,  running 2:28:18, finished second to Paavo Kotila in the 1960 Boston Marathon, an Olympic trials race. In 1961, he finished fourth at Boston, in 2:25:46.

McKenzie was also an AAU cross country champion (1954) who finished fourth in the 5000 meters at the 1955 Pan American Games and was a silver medalist in the marathon at the 1963 Pan American Games, where he ran 2:31:18.  He won U.S. track championship medals at 5K where he finished 2nd in 1953, '54 and '55, 3rd in 1956. At 10K he finished 2nd in 1955 and 1958, 3rd in 1956. He ran for New York University (NYU) and the New York Pioneer Club.

Besides his 1960 Boston time (on an uncertified course), he had personal track bests of 4:12.9 in the indoor mile, set in 1954, at 2 miles 8:58.8 indoors and 3 miles 14:02.9 in 1955, and 10000 meters, 30:34.4, in 1956.

McKenzie was married to the former Christina Slemon, a British middle-distance runner who in 1958 became the first US AAU Champion in the 440 yards, and who, in 1953, had been part of a British world-record setting team in the 3x880 yard relay. Gordon McKenzie's career was as a civil engineer with the city of New York, after studying engineering at NYU.

Personal

McKenzie was from Great Neck, New York. His  wife was Christina Slemon McKenzie, known as Chris, a member of the former British World Record-holding team in the three-times-880 yard relay, and a pioneer who was instrumental in helping women to officially compete at races longer than 220 yards in the U.S. They had three children: Tina, Adam, and Stuart.

References

External links

Gordon McKenzie's obituary

1927 births
2013 deaths
American male long-distance runners
Athletes (track and field) at the 1955 Pan American Games
Athletes (track and field) at the 1956 Summer Olympics
Athletes (track and field) at the 1960 Summer Olympics
Athletes (track and field) at the 1963 Pan American Games
Olympic track and field athletes of the United States
Pan American Games medalists in athletics (track and field)
Pan American Games silver medalists for the United States
People from Great Neck, New York
Sportspeople from Nassau County, New York
Track and field athletes from New York (state)
Medalists at the 1963 Pan American Games